Birchanger Green services is a motorway service station on the M11 motorway at Birchanger near Stansted in Essex, England. It is owned by Welcome Break.

Birchanger Green services scored a 95% satisfaction rating according to a Motorway Services User Survey conducted by Transport Focus in 2019.

References

External links 
Birchanger Green at Motorway Services Info
Motorway Services Online - Birchanger Green
Welcome Break Motorway Services - Birchanger Green - M11 Motorway

Welcome Break motorway service stations